Diadegma acutum is a wasp first described by Henry Lorenz Viereck in 1925. No subspecies are listed.

See also
Platyptilia carduidactyla

References

acutum
Insects described in 1925